2000 Ireland rugby union tour of the Americas.  The 2000 Ireland national rugby union team summer tour saw them play three Test matches against Argentina, the United States and Canada. The touring party included two sets of brothers – Simon and Guy Easterby and David and Paul Wallace. The second Test against the United States remains Ireland's biggest win to date. It also saw Ireland score their most points (83) and their most tries (13) in a single match. In the same game Mike Mullins scored a hat-trick of tries. The tour saw several Ireland players making their senior debuts. David Wallace and Peter McKenna both featured against Argentina. However, while Wallace would on go to become an established international and a British Lion, it proved to be the first and last senior cap for McKenna. Geordan Murphy, Guy Easterby, Tyrone Howe and Frankie Sheahan all made their senior Ireland debuts against the United States.   Murphy and Easterby celebrated the occasion by scoring two tries each.

Touring party
 Manager: Warren Gatland
 Assistant Manager: Eddie O'Sullivan
 Captain: Keith Wood

Backs

 Dominic Crotty (Garryowen)
 Justin Bishop (London Irish)
 Girvan Dempsey (Terenure College)
 Guy Easterby (Ebbw Vale)
 Denis Hickie (St. Mary's College)
 Shane Horgan (Lansdowne)
 Tyrone Howe (Dungannon)
 Rob Henderson (London Wasps)
 David Humphreys (Dungannon)
 Kevin Maggs (Bath)
 Peter McKenna (St. Mary's College)
 Mike Mullins (Young Munster)
 Geordan Murphy (Leicester Tigers)
 Brian O'Driscoll (Blackrock College)
 Ronan O'Gara (Cork Constitution)
 Peter Stringer (Shannon)
 James Topping (Ballymena)

Forwards
 Bob Casey (Blackrock College)
 Peter Clohessy (Young Munster)
 Jeremy Davidson (Castres Olympique)
 Simon Easterby (Llanelli Scarlets)
 Justin Fitzpatrick (Dungannon)
 Anthony Foley (Shannon)
 Mick Galwey (Shannon)
 John Hayes (Shannon)
 Marcus Horan (Shannon)
 Eric Miller (Terenure College)
 Malcolm O'Kelly (St. Mary's College)
 Frankie Sheahan (Cork Constitution)
 David Wallace (Garryowen)
 Paul Wallace (Saracens)
 Andy Ward (Ballynahinch)
 Keith Wood (Garryowen)

Match details
Complete list of matches played by Ireland in the Americas:

Argentina 

Argentina: Ignacio Corleto; Octavio Bartolucci, Eduardo Simone (Felipe Contepomi), Juan Fernández Miranda, Diego Albanese; Gonzalo Quesada, Agustín Pichot (capt); Gonzalo Longo, Rolando Martín, Santiago Phelan, Carlos Ignacio Fernández Lobbe, Alejandro Allub, Martín Scelzo, Federico Méndez, Mauricio Reggiardo. Coach: Marcelo Loffreda 
Ireland: P. McKenna (36' M. Mullins); S. Horgan, R. Henderson, K. Maggs, J. Bishop; D. Humphreys, (R. O'Gara), P. Stringer; A. Foley (A. Ward), D. Wallace, S. Easterby; M. O'Kelly, M. Galwey; J. Hayes, K. Wood (capt), P. Clohessy. Coach: W. Gatland

United States

Canada 

Canada: W. Stanley; M. Irvine, N. Witkowski, K. Nichols, S. Fauth; S. Stewart, M. Williams; P. Murphy, R. Banks, G. Dixon; J. Tait, E. Knaggs; J. Thiel, P. Dunkley, R. Snow. Coach: 

Ireland: D. Crotty; S. Horgan, M. Mullins, K. Maggs, J. Bishop; D. Humphreys, P. Stringer; A. Foley, A. Ward, S. Easterby; J. Davidson, M. Galwey; J. Hayes, K. Wood (capt), J. Fitzpatrick. Coach: W. Gatland

References

2000
2000
2000
2000
tour
2000 in Argentine rugby union
2000 in Canadian rugby union
2000 in American rugby union
History of rugby union matches between Argentina and Ireland